Christopher George Wesley (born 23 June 1987) is a German former field hockey player who played as a midfielder or forward. At the 2012 Summer Olympics, he competed for the national team in the men's tournament.

Career
Wesley played his whole career for Nürnberger HTC in the German Bundesliga. He played a total of 162 matches for the national team from 2005 until 2016 in which he scored 28 goals. In April 2020 he announced his retirement from top-level hockey.

References

External links
 
 
 
 

1987 births
Living people
German male field hockey players
Male field hockey midfielders
Male field hockey forwards
Field hockey players at the 2012 Summer Olympics
2014 Men's Hockey World Cup players
Field hockey players at the 2016 Summer Olympics
Olympic field hockey players of Germany
Olympic gold medalists for Germany
Olympic bronze medalists for Germany
Olympic medalists in field hockey
Medalists at the 2012 Summer Olympics
Medalists at the 2016 Summer Olympics
Sportspeople from Nuremberg
21st-century German people